The Monument to Christopher Columbus is a monument in Galway, Ireland. The memorial was erected in 1992, the year of the Columbus Quincentenary, to commemorate Christopher Columbus's visit to the city in 1477. It stands next to the Spanish Arch.

History 
In 1992, Mick Wilkins, a Cork sculptor, was hired to create a sculpture to commemorate Christopher Columbus's visit to Galway in 1477. The sculpture was gifted by Genoa, Columbus's hometown, to commemorate the 500th anniversary of Columbus's setting sail on the voyage that would result in his landing in North America.

The inscription on the plinth reads:

In June 2020, during the George Floyd protests, a number of monuments were removed or vandalized around the world, this included a number of Christopher Columbus statues in the United States. The monument in Galway was defaced on June 10, with calls to remove the monument.

See also 
 List of monuments and memorials to Christopher Columbus

References 

Monuments and memorials in the Republic of Ireland
Outdoor sculptures in Ireland
Galway (city)
1992 establishments in Ireland
Statues of Christopher Columbus
Vandalized works of art